The 1980 NCAA Division I Wrestling Championships were the 50th NCAA Division I Wrestling Championships to be held. Oregon State University in Corvallis, Oregon hosted the tournament at the Gill Coliseum.

Iowa took home the team championship with 110.75 points and having two individual champions.

Howard Harris of Oregon State received the Gorriaran Award as well as being named the Most Outstanding Wrestler.

Team results

Individual finals

References

NCAA Division I Wrestling Championship
NCAA
Wrestling competitions in the United States
NCAA Division I  Wrestling Championships
NCAA Division I  Wrestling Championships
NCAA Division I  Wrestling Championships
Wrestling in Oregon